Association of Environmental Engineering and Science Professors (AEESP) is made up of professors in academic programs throughout the world who provide education in the sciences and technologies of environmental protection.  The headquarters are located in Washington, DC.

History 
AEESP was founded in 1963 as the American Association of Professors of Sanitary Engineering (AAPSE) and later as the Association of Environmental Engineering Professors (AEEP).

Membership 
The more than 700 members of AEESP include faculty, students, and affiliates in the fields of environmental engineering and environmental engineering science.

Mission 
The Association assists its members in improving education and research programs, encourages undergraduate and graduate education, and serves the profession by providing information to government agencies and the public.  Direct services provided to members include publication of the journal, Environmental Engineering Science, hosting biennial research and education conferences, coordinating recognition of excellence in research, teaching, and service, and providing a forum for the exchange of information relevant to the field including newsletters, online media, workshops, and lectures.

Awards 
Through the AEESP Foundation, recognition of members include: doctoral dissertation and MS thesis awards; educator and educational content awards; global engagement, research, and publication awards; and the Perry L. McCarty Founders Award. In collaboration with sister organizations, the AEESP recognizes outstanding students, outstanding teaching, and outstanding integration of research, teaching, and the practice of environmental engineering with the Pohland Medal.

See also
American Academy of Environmental Engineers and Scientists
American Chemical Society
American Institute of Chemical Engineers
American Public Health Association
American Public Works Association
American Society for Engineering Education
American Society for Microbiology
American Society of Civil Engineers
American Society of Mechanical Engineers
American Water Works Association
International Water Association
National Society of Professional Engineers
Solid Waste Association of North America
Water Environment Federation

References

External links
 Official Website of AEESP

American engineering organizations
Organizations established in 1963
1963 establishments in the United States
Engineering societies based in the United States